Elaphidion tuberculicolle is a species of beetle in the family Cerambycidae. It was described by Fisher in 1932.

References

tuberculicolle
Beetles described in 1932